Bert Worsley (20 September 1911 – 21 June 1971) was a professional footballer who played as a right-winger for Leeds United and Fulham F.C.  Earlier in his career when he was playing for Manchester North End, in October 1931 he was signed as a professional by Bolton Wanderers.

References

Manchester North End F.C. players
Fulham F.C. players
Leeds United F.C. players
English footballers
1911 births
1971 deaths
Association football midfielders